Sir Thomas Cotton, 2nd Baronet (c. 167212 June 1715) was an English peer and officer of the Crown.

Life
He was born the son of Sir Robert Cotton and Hester Salusbury, daughter of Royalist politician and soldier Sir Thomas Salusbury. Sheriff of Cheshire from 1712 to 1713, he succeeded to the Cotton Baronetcy on 17December 1712.

Family
Sir Thomas married Philadelphia (5May 167530December 1758), daughter and heiress of Sir Thomas Lynch, three time Governor of Jamaica, and his first wife Vere Herbert, around 18November 1689. The couple had the following issue:

 Thomas Salusbury (c. 1691 – 1710), heir apparent.
 Henry (born c. 1692), died young.
 Anne (born c. 1693), died young.
 Sir Robert Salusbury, inherited his father's title as 3rd Baronet.
 Philadelphia (born 19 March 1698), married Thomas Boycott of Hinton, Shropshire
 Stephen Salusbury (1700–1727)
 Hugh Calveley (c. 170124 June 1702)
 John Salusbury (1708 – 1730)
 Sophia (c. 1704c. 1756), unmarried.
 Sir Lynch Salusbury (c. 170614 August 1775), inherited his brother's title as 4th Baronet.
 Hester Maria (c. 170720 August 1733) married John Salusbury of Bachecraig, Flint. 
 Sidney Arabella (female) (c. 170930 January 1781), unmarried.
 George Calveley (c. 1710–1715)
 William Salusbury (c. 1712 – c. 1715)
 Vere (female) (c. 171323 September 1730)
 Henry Salusbury (c. 1714 – ?), died young.

References

Bibliography

1670s births
1715 deaths
Cotton, Sir Thomas, 2nd Baronet
17th-century English nobility
High Sheriffs of Cheshire